Ada Mary Langford (23 November 1894 – 11 March 1973) was a British swimmer. She competed in the women's 100 metre freestyle event at the 1912 Summer Olympics.

References

1894 births
1973 deaths
British female swimmers
Olympic swimmers of Great Britain
Swimmers at the 1912 Summer Olympics
Sportspeople from Liverpool
British female freestyle swimmers